Geophilus pusillus is a species of soil centipede in the family Geophilidae found in Algeria. It grows up to 11 millimeters in length. The males of this species have 31 or 33 pairs of legs; females have 35 pairs. Records from the Alpstein mountains indicate that G. pusillus is a soil-dwelling species (burrowing as deep as 30cm) that prefers humus-rich soil, but these records deserve confirmation.

References 

pusillus
Arthropods of Africa
Animals described in 1870
Taxa named by Frederik Vilhelm August Meinert